Nemesio Martínez (21 March 1897 – 26 July 1936) was a Spanish equestrian. He competed in two events at the 1924 Summer Olympics.

References

External links
 

1897 births
1936 deaths
Spanish male equestrians
Olympic equestrians of Spain
Equestrians at the 1924 Summer Olympics
Spanish casualties of the Spanish Civil War
Military personnel killed in the Spanish Civil War